Jack Hughes (1866 – after 1890) was an English professional footballer who played in the Football Alliance for Small Heath. Born in Birmingham, Hughes played football for Birmingham Unity before joining Small Heath in August 1890. He played only once in the Football Alliance, in the opening game of the 1890–91 season, deputising at centre half for Caesar Jenkyns; Small Heath lost 5–2 away to Walsall Town Swifts.

References

1866 births
Year of death missing
Footballers from Birmingham, West Midlands
English footballers
Association football defenders
Birmingham City F.C. players
Date of birth missing
Place of death missing
Football Alliance players